Drunk Uncle may refer to:

 Drunk Uncle (Saturday Night Live), a Saturday Night Live character
 Drunk Uncle (album), an album by Cropduster